Saint-Blimont is a commune in the Somme department in Hauts-de-France in northern France.

Geography
Sitting squarely between the industrial Vimeu region and the tourist regions of Picardie.

History
Closely linked with Saint-Valery-sur-Somme. The monk evangelist Saint Valery healed Blimond around 615, who succeeded him as head of the abbey at Saint-Valery-sur-Somme.

Population

Places of interest
 The fifteenth century watchtower that has been a belltower for about 150 years. The tower is accessible in July and August, with guided visits every Saturday at 11 o'clock.
 The nineteenth century church, with interesting elements such as beams, a baptismal font originating from the previous sixteenth century church and a 15th-century statue of Saint Blimond.

See also
Communes of the Somme department

References

Communes of Somme (department)